J.B. Hanauer, a wealth management firm established in 1931 and based in Parsippany, New Jersey, was bought out by RBC Dain Rauscher in March 2007. RBC Dain Rauscher changed its name to RBC Wealth Management in October 2009.

References

Firms
Parsippany, NJ
Philadelphia, PA
West Palm Beach, FL
Ft. Lauderdale, FL
Tampa, FL

Stock brokerages and investment banks of Canada